Vitrolles-en-Luberon is a commune in the Vaucluse department in the Provence-Alpes-Côte d'Azur region in southeastern France.

See also
http://vitrolles-en-luberon.fr/
 Côtes du Luberon AOC
Communes of the Vaucluse department
Luberon

References

Communes of Vaucluse